Mikail Albayrak (born 6 April 1992) is a Turkish footballer who plays as a midfielder for Turkish club Gümüşhanespor. He made his Süper Lig debut on 6 March 2011.

References

External links
 
 
 

1992 births
Footballers from Lyon
French people of Turkish descent
French emigrants to Turkey
Living people
Turkish footballers
Turkey under-21 international footballers
Association football midfielders
Eskişehirspor footballers
Bozüyükspor footballers
Şanlıurfaspor footballers
Yeni Malatyaspor footballers
Altay S.K. footballers
Ankara Keçiörengücü S.K. footballers
Sarıyer S.K. footballers
Kırklarelispor footballers
Aydınspor footballers
Çorumspor footballers
Gümüşhanespor footballers
Süper Lig players
TFF Second League players
TFF Third League players